Holters Crossing is an unincorporated community and census-designated place (CDP) in Centre County, Pennsylvania, United States. It was first listed as a CDP prior to the 2020 census.

The CDP is in northern Centre County, mostly in the southeastern part of Boggs Township and partly in the southwestern corner of Howard Township. It sits in the Bald Eagle Valley, on the south side of Bald Eagle Creek. County Route 1006 (old U.S. Route 220) is the main road through the community; it leads southwest  to Milesburg and northeast  to a dead end at Mount Eagle, at the head of Foster Joseph Sayers Reservoir, an impoundment on Bald Eagle Creek.

Demographics

References 

Census-designated places in Centre County, Pennsylvania
Census-designated places in Pennsylvania